St. Xavier's College, Lengpui, Mizoram, India, is an undergraduate college opened in 2017. It is named after St. Francis Xavier, a Navarre Jesuit of the 16th century, who ministered in India. It is the first catholic college in Mizoram, India.

History 
The college was started at the request of the Bishop of Aizawl, Stephen Rotluanga. The foundation stone was laid in November 2016 and the College was inaugurated on 18 July 2017 by the Chief Minister of Mizoram Lalthanhawla. The college is named after Francis Xavier, the 16th century Jesuit saint from Navarre, northern Spain.

Location

The college campus is located at Lengpui in a 29-acre plot.

Academic
The college is administered by the Jesuit order's Darjeeling Province. St. Xavier's University, Kolkata, will offer academic help. It is already affiliated to Mizoram University here are seven humanities courses in the UG level - Mizo, English, history, sociology, political science and psychology.

References 

Jesuit universities and colleges in India
Mizoram University
Universities and colleges in Mizoram
Colleges affiliated to Mizoram University
Education in Aizawl
Educational institutions established in 2017
2017 establishments in Mizoram